The Khulna Titans are a franchise cricket team based in Khulna, Bangladesh, which plays in the Bangladesh Premier League (BPL). They are one of the seven teams that are competing in the 2016 Bangladesh Premier League. The team is captained by Mahmudullah Riyad.

Player draft
The 2016 BPL draft was held on 30 September. Prior to the draft, the seven clubs signed 38 foreign players to contracts and each existing franchise was able to retain two home-grown players from the 2015 season. A total 301 players participated in the draft, including 133 local and 168 foreign players. 85 players were selected in the draft.

Player transfers
Prior to the 2016 draft, a number of high-profile players moved teams. These included transfers between competing teams and due to the suspension of the Sylhet Super Stars and the introduction of two new teams, Khulna Titans and Rajshahi Kings. Transfers included the move of Barisal Bulls captain Mahmudullah Riyad to the Khulna Titans.

Standings

 The top four teams will qualify for playoffs
  advanced to the Qualifier
  advanced to the Eliminator

Current squad

Support staff
Managing Director – [Md Enam Ahmed]
Head Coach –Stuart Law
Manager – Nafees Iqbal
Technical Advisor –Habibul Bashar

References 

Bangladesh Premier League
Khulna Tigers cricketers